Peer contagion refers to the "mutual influence that occurs between an individual and a peer", and "includes behaviors and emotions that potentially undermine one's own development or cause harm to others". Peer contagion refers to the transmission or transfer of deviant behavior from one adolescent to another. It can take many forms, including aggression, bullying, weapon carrying, disordered eating, drug use, gender dysphoria , and depression. It can happen in natural settings where peer dealings occur as well as in intervention and education programs.

Awareness of influence is uncommon and it is often not intentional. Rather "they engage in relationship behaviors that satisfy immediate needs for an audience or companionship" unintentionally. Many processes of peer contagion have been suggested, including deviancy training.

Deviancy training 

In the context of deviance, peer contagion attributes the "activity and result of youth conversations" to the "promotion of deviant behavior" typical of  "youth  that are in peer groups who have little structure or supervision"

Other possible avenues 

Social learning theorists suggest that peer contagion happens after the observation of deviant behavior amid social reinforcement. Normative socialization is the process by which adolescents try to remove dissimilarities between themselves and other youth. Friendship selection is the process of youth choosing deviant peer groups because of shared interests.

Some researchers claim that one dynamic of peer contagion may precede adolescent friendships. Adolescents may adopt behaviors with the expectation that this will lead to friendship or acceptance in a peer group. Evidence also exists that adolescents seek out peer groups based on mood and that connecting with a group with a similar mood will tend to intensify it.

Peer groups also tend to feed off of themselves, without member awareness, pressuring members to become more homogeneous over time, through the reinforcement of verbal expressions, particularly involving a response of laughter.

See also
 Emotional contagion
 Peer pressure

References 

Socialization
Emotional issues
Group processes
Interpersonal communication